Seven Days' Leave may refer to:

 Seven Days Leave (1930 film), a film starring Gary Cooper
 Seven Days' Leave (1942 film), a musical comedy